Dexter McDonald (born November 30, 1991) is a former American football cornerback. He was drafted by the Oakland Raiders in the seventh round of the 2015 NFL Draft. He played college football at University of Kansas.

Professional career 
On March 25, 2015, McDonald worked out at Kansas' pro day, where he wowed scouts by jumping higher than the measuring device could measure. After several adjustments and re-jumps, the scouts credited him with a 40.5 inch standing vertical jump. He then created more buzz by recording an 11'-2" broad jump.

Oakland Raiders
McDonald was drafted by the Oakland Raiders in the seventh round, 242nd overall, in the 2015 NFL Draft.

On September 1, 2018, McDonald was waived/injured by the Raiders and was placed on injured reserve.

References

External links
Oakland Raiders bio
Kansas Jayhawks bio

1991 births
Living people
Players of American football from Kansas City, Missouri
American football cornerbacks
Kansas Jayhawks football players
Oakland Raiders players